Borislav Dichev (born 28 June 1979) is a Bulgarian footballer currently playing for Minyor Pernik as an attacker.

Dichev was raised in Levski Sofia's youths teams.

He also played for Akademik Sofia, Septemvri Sofia, Dunav Rousse, Svetkavitsa, Beroe Stara Zagora, Belite orli Pleven and Vidima-Rakovski Sevlievo.

With Minyor in season 2004/2005 Dichev scored the fantastics 35 goals in 31 matches in third division.

With Vidima-Rakovski Borislav Dichev becomes Top goal scorer of Bulgarian second division for the 2006/2007 season with 20 goals in 26 matches. He also was named the Best Footballer of the Season in second division.

Between 1999 and 2000 Dichev was capped 4 times for the Bulgaria national under-21 football team.

External links
 footmercato profile

1979 births
Living people
Bulgarian footballers
Bulgaria under-21 international footballers
First Professional Football League (Bulgaria) players
Second Professional Football League (Bulgaria) players
Akademik Sofia players
FC Septemvri Sofia players
FC Dunav Ruse players
PFC Svetkavitsa players
PFC Beroe Stara Zagora players
PFC Minyor Pernik players
PFC Vidima-Rakovski Sevlievo players

Association football forwards